Reidar Kristoffersen is a former speedway rider from Norway. He became champion of Norway after winning the 1955 Norwegian Championship.

References 

Norwegian speedway riders
Possibly living people
Year of birth missing